Edward Hanes Jr. is an American politician. He is a former member of the North Carolina General Assembly, who represented the 72nd district in the North Carolina House of Representatives.

Hanes was first elected to the North Carolina House in 2012. He resigned in August 2018.

Electoral history

2020

2016

2014

2012

References

External links

Living people
Year of birth missing (living people)
People from Winston-Salem, North Carolina
21st-century American politicians
Democratic Party members of the North Carolina House of Representatives
University of North Carolina at Chapel Hill alumni
University of North Carolina School of Law alumni
Harvard Graduate School of Education alumni